Il-dong is a neighbourhood of Sangnok-gu, Ansan, Gyeonggi Province, South Korea.

External links
 Il-dong 

Sangnok-gu
Neighbourhoods in Ansan